Waite Hockin Stirling (1829 – 19 November 1923) was a 19th-century missionary with the Patagonian Missionary Society (later known as the South American Missionary Society) and was the first Anglican Bishop of the Falkland Islands. He was brother-in-law to Thomas Phinn. He was also a grandnephew of Sir Thomas Stirling, 5th Baronet of Ardoch.

In the mid-19th century, the Patagonian Missionary Society suffered several major losses and setbacks in the project for the Yaghan people at Tierra del Fuego archipelago. In 1851 Captain Allen Gardiner and his companions at Spanish Harbour on Picton Island died of starvation. In 1859 the Yahgan massacred a group of missionaries at Wulaia, Navarino Island.

In 1854, the Society re-established its missionary base at Keppel Island in the Falkland Islands; Stirling became secretary of the mission in England. In 1861 he went to Keppel Island as the mission superintendent. From there, he re-established contacts with the Yaghan of Tierra del Fuego. In January 1869 he served as a lone missionary at Ushuaia in Tierra del Fuego.

Whilst serving at Ushuaia as "God's Lonely Sentinel", as Stirling called himself, he was summoned to London to be consecrated on 21 December 1869 in Westminster Abbey as "Bishop of the Falkland Islands." It was contemporary practice to name overseas bishoprics after one of Her Majesty's possessions. Seven consular chaplaincies in South America and several private company chaplains were placed under Stirling's jurisdiction. He spent his first few years establishing his authority over recalcitrant clergy and congregations. They resented this Episcopal "upstart" and thought they still owed allegiance to the Bishop of London, previously responsible for the supervision of overseas Colonial and Consular Chaplaincies.

The Anglican mission at Ushuaia was expanded by Thomas Bridges and George Lewis, who lived there with their families starting in 1871. Later relocated within the Tierra del Fuego archipelago, the mission was continued by other ministers until 1916.

On 14 January 1872, Bishop Stirling was assigned his "Throne and Episcopal Chair" by the Colonial Chaplain, the Reverend Charles Bull. His enthronement was to take place in the Exchange Building in Port Stanley; however, Stirling refused to be enthroned in "half a commercial building" because it was not a cathedral. After a wall of the Exchange Building was destroyed in 1886, the present Stanley Cathedral was built, and consecrated in 1892.

Bishop Stirling resigned from the Falklands diocese in 1900 to become a Canon and Assistant Bishop at Wells Cathedral in England. He served there for 20 years until his retirement at the age of 91.

See also
 Martin Gusinde Anthropological Museum, the history of the Stirling House
SAMS Pamphlets by Waite Stirling:

Books by Waite Stirling:

Works concerning Waite Stirling:

References

External links
Sermon preached at the consecration of Waite Hockin Stirling 1870
Falklands.info

Anglican bishops of the Falkland Islands
English Anglican missionaries
Anglican missionaries in Argentina
1829 births
1923 deaths
Anglican mission in Tierra del Fuego
Anglican missionaries in Chile